Juan M. Escobar is a former county judge and State Representative in Texas.

Early life and education
Early in his life, Escobar was a migrant worker. Escobar attended Roma High School, where he was a Texas All-State Class AA first team selection in basketball, competed in the 440 at the Texas Class AA State final, and served as Student Council President during his senior year.

Military service

Escobar served with the 1st Marine Division in Vietnam where he was wounded in action in 1970.  He rose to the rank of Sergeant and was assigned to United States Marine Barracks 8th & I in Washington, D.C. where he was a pall bearer for Presidents Lyndon B. Johnson and Harry S. Truman. He ended his duties as a Marine and was promoted to the rank of Staff Sergeant in the United States Marine Corps Reserve where he served as a Platoon Sergeant with a Reco Unit.

He began his career with U.S. Border Patrol in 1978 and was the "Patrol Agent in Charge" at the Sarita checkpoint for several years.  His exceptional service with the Border Patrol led to his promotion to Senior Special Agent with the Organized Crime Drug Enforcement Task Force.  He retired from the Department of Homeland Security in 2003.

Political career
Escobar was elected to the Texas House of Representatives in a special election to replace the late Irma Rangel in May 2003.  He served in that capacity until January 2009.   He served as Vice Chair of the Defense Affairs—State Federal Relations, Criminal Jurisprudence, House Administration, Border and Intergovernmental Affairs and Land and Resource Management.

In 2008 he was defeated by fellow Democrat Tara Rios Ybarra 53.74% to his 46.25% in a higher than average turnout election.

In 2010 he was elected as Kleberg County Judge, and served until December 2014.

Personal life
Escobar lives in Kingsville, Texas with his wife of 43 years, Maria del Rosario (Rosie).  He is a lay minister and former administrator for St. Joseph's Catholic Church in Kingsville.  He serves as a Major in the Civil Air Patrol.

His children are Yvonne Yvette and Eduardo Eden, daughter in law Marleena and two grandsons Branden Luke and Jacob Dylan.

References

External links 
 TedKennedy.org
 "House Passes Bill to Expand CHIP" Brownsville Herald

Texas lawyers
Living people
County judges in Texas
Hispanic and Latino American state legislators in Texas
Democratic Party members of the Texas House of Representatives
Year of birth missing (living people)